Maithil cuisine, also known as Mithila cuisine, is a part of Indian and Nepalese cuisine. It is the traditional cooking style of Maithils residing in the Mithila region of India and Nepal. 

Maithil cuisine comprises a broad repertoire of rice, wheat, fish and meat dishes and the use of various spices, herbs and natural edibles. The cuisine is categorized by types of food for various events, from banquets, to weddings and parties, festival foods, and travel foods.

The service style of the cuisine has little similarity with that of the French table d'hôte; all preparations are served together on a platter and consumed at once. The staple food is bhat (boiled rice), dal, roti, tarkari and achar, prepared from rice, lentils, wheat flour, vegetables, and pickles. The traditional cooking medium is mustard oil.

Types of meat 
While Hindus do not eat beef, they will drink cow and buffalo milk. An old saying shows the importance of milk products in Maithil cuisine: “” (A meal is the meal that starts with ghee and ends with yogurt).

Vegetarian 
Vegetarian food like  (leafy vegetables with very thin gravy), as well as vegetables such as bitter gourd, ladyfinger, are eaten. It can also be made with paneer or in a non-vegetarian style with shrimp added.

Seafood 
 is a fish curry and steamed rice. Machhak jhor is a traditional fish curry used in many events with the exception of some religious festivals.

Sauces and curries 
Dried mango strips are widely used to give tartness in various gravies. Some sauces and gravies include:

  — a thin mustard and coriander-based gravy with chilli
  — fried soft dumplings made of besan, gram flour, cooked in spicy gravy
Generally enjoyed with malpua,  (chapatti) , or steamed rice.
  — commonly an oyster stew cooked with onion gravy
  — a preparation of marinated sun-dried colocasia leaves, steamed and cooked in mustard gravy 
  — a sauce prepared from green peas and flavouring, generally eaten with rice or rotis
  — fried soft dumplings made of besan cooked in a spicy gravy of yogurt

Breakfast 

Snacks and desserts 
Some snacks include:

  (beaten rice fried with sliced onion, chopped green chillies and green peas)
  (popped corn)
  (rice pops mixed with chopped green chillies, onion, coriander leaf, salt and a few drops of mustard oil)
  (jalebi-like salted batter made of besan flour)
 Samosas
 Launglati
 
 
Sweet foods are also popular. Varieties of kheer are a common dessert, including  which is prepared with lotus seeds, milk and dried nuts). Malpua is popular and has a traditional Mithila preparation that differs from that of north India. Both are prepared from a flour batter; in north India after deep frying they are dipped in sugar syrup, while in Mithila the batter itself is sweetened and it is a dry preparation which can be stored for two to three days. Laddoo, khaja, chandrakala, rasgulla, and other desserts are common. Sakrauri ( boondi in condensed milk topped with nuts ) would be another dessert maithils love to have after an hefty meal. An introduction to Mithila cuisine would remain incomplete without a reference to paan (betel leaves). A sweet betel leaf is flavoured with ingredients such as sweet fennel, cardamom, clove, rose petals, and sugar crystal and eaten as a dessert.

Traditional dishes
Some traditional Maithil dishes are:
Dahi-Chura
Vegetable of Arikanch
Kadhi bari
Ghooghni
Tarua
Bada
Badee
Maachh
Mutton
Irhar
Purakiya
Makhan Payas
Anarasa
Bagiya

See also 

 Indian cuisine
 Murabba

References

Indian cuisine
Nepalese cuisine